Multiple hypotheses explain the possible connections between sleep and learning in humans. Research indicates that sleep does more than allow the brain to rest; it may also aid the consolidation of long-term memories.

REM sleep and slow-wave sleep play different roles in memory consolidation. REM is associated with the consolidation of nondeclarative (implicit) memories. An example of a nondeclarative memory would be a task that we can do without consciously thinking about it, such as riding a bike. Slow-wave, or non-REM (NREM) sleep, is associated with the consolidation of declarative (explicit) memories. These are facts that need to be consciously remembered, such as dates for a history class.

Increased learning
Popular sayings can reflect the notion that remolded memories produce new creative associations in the morning, and that performance often improves after a time-interval that includes sleep. Current studies demonstrate that a healthy sleep produces a significant learning-dependent performance boost. The idea is that sleep helps the brain to edit its memory, looking for important patterns and extracting overarching rules which could be described as 'the gist', and integrating this with existing memory.  The 'synaptic scaling' hypothesis suggests that sleep plays an important role in regulating learning that has taken place while awake, enabling more efficient and effective storage in the brain, making better use of space and energy.

Healthy sleep must include the appropriate sequence and proportion of NREM and REM phases, which play different roles in the memory consolidation-optimization process. During a normal night of sleep, a person will alternate between periods of NREM and REM sleep. Each cycle is approximately 90 minutes long, containing a 20-30 minute bout of REM sleep. NREM sleep consists of sleep stages 1–4, and is where movement can be observed.  A person can still move their body when they are in NREM sleep. If someone sleeping turns, tosses, or rolls over, this indicates that they are in NREM sleep. REM sleep is characterized by the lack of muscle activity. Physiological studies have shown that aside from the occasional twitch, a person actually becomes paralyzed during REM sleep.  In motor skill learning, an interval of sleep may be critical for the expression of performance gains; without sleep these gains will be delayed.

Procedural memories are a form of nondeclarative memory, so they would most benefit from the fast-wave REM sleep. In a study, procedural memories have been shown to benefit from sleep.    Subjects were tested using a tapping task, where they used their fingers to tap a specific sequence of numbers on a keyboard, and their performances were measured by accuracy and speed. This finger-tapping task was used to simulate learning a motor skill. The first group was tested, retested 12 hours later while awake, and finally tested another 12 hours later with sleep in between. The other group was tested, retested 12 hours later with sleep in between, and then retested 12 hours later while awake. The results showed that in both groups, there was only a slight improvement after a 12-hour wake session, but a significant increase in performance after each group slept. This study gives evidence that REM sleep is a significant factor in consolidating motor skill procedural memories, therefore sleep deprivation can impair performance on a motor learning task.  This memory decrement results specifically from the loss of stage 2, REM sleep.

Declarative memory has also been shown to benefit from sleep, but not in the same way as procedural memory. Declarative memories benefit from the slow-waves nREM sleep. A study was conducted where the subjects learned word pairs, and the results showed that sleep not only prevents the decay of memory, but also actively fixates declarative memories. Two of the groups learned word pairs, then either slept or stayed awake, and were tested again. The other two groups did the same thing, except they also learned interference pairs right before being retested to try to disrupt the previously learned word pairs. The results showed that sleep was of some help in retaining the word pair associations, while against the interference pair, sleep helped significantly.

After sleep, there is increased insight.  This is because sleep helps people to reanalyze their memories. The same patterns of brain activity that occur during learning have been found to occur again during sleep, only faster. One way that sleep strengthens memories is by weeding out the less successful connections between neurons in the brain.  This weeding out is essential to prevent overactivity.  The brain compensates for strengthening some synapses (connections) between neurons, by weakening others.  The weakening process occurs mostly during sleep. This weakening during sleep allows for strengthening of other connections while we are awake. Learning is the process of strengthening connections, therefore this process could be a major explanation for the benefits that sleep has on memory.

Research has shown that taking an afternoon nap increases learning capacity. A study  tested two groups of subjects on a nondeclarative memory task. One group engaged in REM sleep, and one group did not (meaning that they engaged in NREM sleep). The investigators found that the subjects who engaged only in NREM sleep did not show much improvement. The subjects who engaged in REM sleep performed significantly better, indicating that REM sleep facilitated the consolidation of nondeclarative memories.  A more recent study demonstrated that a procedural task was learned and retained better if it was encountered immediately before going to sleep, while a declarative task was learned better in the afternoon.

Electrophysiological evidence in rats

A 2009 study based on electrophysiological recordings of large ensembles of isolated cells in the prefrontal cortex of rats revealed that cell assemblies that formed upon learning were more preferentially active during subsequent sleep episodes. More specifically, those replay events were more prominent during slow wave sleep and were concomitant with hippocampal reactivation events. This study has shown that neuronal patterns in large brain networks are tagged during learning so that they are replayed, and supposedly consolidated, during subsequent sleep. There have been other studies that have shown similar reactivation of learning pattern during motor skill and neuroprosthetic learning. Notably, new evidence is showing that reactivation and rescaling may be co-occurring during sleep.

Sleep in relation to school
Sleep has been directly linked to the grades of students. One in four U.S. high school students admit to falling asleep in class at least once a week. Consequently, results have shown that those who sleep less do poorly. In the United States, sleep deprivation is common with students because almost all schools begin early in the morning and many of these students either choose to stay awake late into the night or cannot do otherwise due to delayed sleep phase syndrome. As a result, students that should be getting between 8.5 and 9.25 hours of sleep are getting only 7 hours. Perhaps because of this sleep deprivation, their grades are lower and their concentration is impaired.

As a result of studies showing the effects of sleep deprivation on grades, and the different sleep patterns for teenagers, a school in New Zealand changed its start time to 10:30 a.m. in 2006, to allow students to keep to a schedule that allowed more sleep. In 2009, Monkseaton High School, in North Tyneside, had 800 pupils aged 13–19 starting lessons at 10 a.m. instead of the normal 9 a.m. and reported that general absence dropped by 8% and persistent absenteeism by 27%. Similarly, a high school in Copenhagen has committed to providing at least one class per year for students which will start at 10 a.m. or later.

College students represent one of the most sleep-deprived segments of the population.  Only 11% of American college students sleep well, and 40% of students feel well rested only two days per week. About 73% have experienced at least some occasional sleep issues.  This poor sleep is thought to have a severe impact on their ability to learn and remember information because the brain is being deprived of time that it needs to consolidate information which is essential to the learning process.

See also

 Dream
 List of thought processes
 Lucid dream
 Preconscious
 Sharp wave–ripple complexes
 Sleep-learning
 Unconscious mind

References

External links
 "Study puts us one step closer to understanding the function of sleep" - from University of Wisconsin-Madison School of Medicine and Public Health
 "To sleep, perchance to learn" - from Nature
 "Birds May Refine Their Songs While Sleeping" - from Science
 "Review of Studies showing sleep helps improve memory, learning" - from Science and Nature

Sleep
Sleep physiology
Learning